Anthene discimacula is a butterfly in the family Lycaenidae. It is found in the Democratic Republic of the Congo (Ituri, Tshopo and Sankuru).

References

Butterflies described in 1921
Anthene
Endemic fauna of the Democratic Republic of the Congo
Butterflies of Africa